Lionel Williams (born 26 November 1937) is a Barbadian cricketer. He played in two first-class matches for the Barbados cricket team in 1956/57 and 1964/65.

See also
 List of Barbadian representative cricketers

References

External links
 

1937 births
Living people
Barbadian cricketers
Barbados cricketers
People from Saint Michael, Barbados